The Von Hippel–Lindau tumor suppressor also known as pVHL is a protein that, in humans, is encoded by the VHL gene.  Mutations of the VHL gene are associated with Von Hippel–Lindau disease.

Function 

The protein encoded by the VHL gene is the substrate recognition component of a protein complex that includes elongin B, elongin C, and cullin-2, and possesses E3 ubiquitin ligase activity. This complex is involved in the ubiquitination and subsequent degradation of hypoxia-inducible factors (HIFs), which are transcription factors that play a central role regulating gene expression in response to changing oxygen levels. RNA polymerase II subunit POLR2G/RPB7 is also reported to be a target of this protein. Alternatively spliced transcript variants encoding distinct isoforms have been observed.

The resultant protein is produced in two forms, an 18 kDa and a 30 kDa protein that functions as a tumor suppressor. The main action of the VHL protein is thought to be its E3 ubiquitin ligase activity that results in specific target proteins being 'marked' for degradation.

The most researched of these targets is hypoxia inducible factor 1a (HIF1a), a transcription factor that induces the expression of a number of angiogenesis related factors.

HIFs are necessary for tumor growth because most cancers demand high metabolic activity and are only supplied by structurally or functionally inadequate vasculature. Activation of HIFs allow for enhanced angiogenesis, which in turn allow for increased glucose uptake. While HIFs are mostly active in hypoxic conditions, VHL-defective renal carcinoma cells show constitutive activation of HIF even in oxygenated environments.

It is clear that VHL and HIFs interact closely. Firstly, all renal cell carcinoma mutations in VHL that have been tested affect the protein's ability to modify HIF. Additionally, HIF activation can be detected in the earliest events in tumorigenesis in patients with VHL syndrome. In normal cells in hypoxic conditions, HIF1A is activated with little activation of HIF2A. However, in tumors the balance of HIF1A and HIF2A is tipped towards HIF2A. While HIF1A serves as a pro-apoptotic factor, HIF2A interacts with cyclin D1. This leads to increased survival due to lower rates of apoptosis and increased proliferation due to the activation of cyclin D1. Recent genome-wide analysis (GWAS) of HIF binding in kidney cancer showed that HIF1A binds upstream of majorly good prognosis genes, while HIF2A binds upstream to majorly poor prognosis genes. This indicates that the HIF transcription factor distribution in kidney cancer is of major importance in determining the outcome of the patients.

In the normal cell with active VHL protein, HIF alpha is regulated by hydroxylation in the presence of oxygen. When iron, 2-oxoglutarate and oxygen are present, HIF is inactivated by HIF hydroxylases. Hydroxylation of HIF creates a binding site for pVHL (the protein product of the VHL gene). pVHL directs the polyubiquitylation of HIF1A, ensuring that this protein will be degraded by the proteasome. In hypoxic conditions, HIF1A subunits accumulate and bind to HIFB. This heterodimer of HIF is a transcription factor that activates genes that encode for proteins such as vascular endothelial growth factor (VEGF) and erythropoietin, proteins that are both involved in angiogenesis. Cells with abnormal pVHL are unable to disrupt the formation of these dimers, and therefore behave like they are hypoxic even in oxygenated environments.

HIF has also been linked to mTOR, a central controller of growth decisions. It has recently been shown that HIF activation can inactivate mTOR.

HIF can help explain the organ-specific nature of VHL syndrome. It has been theorized that constitutively activating HIF in any cell could lead to cancer, but that there are redundant regulators of HIF in organs not affected by VHL syndrome. This theory has been disproved multiple times since in all cell types loss of VHL function leads to constitutive activation of HIF and its downstream effects. Another theory holds that although in all cells loss of VHL leads to activation of HIF, in most cells this leads to no advantage in proliferation or survival. Additionally, the nature of the mutation in the VHL protein leads to phenotypic manifestations in the pattern of cancer that develops. Nonsense or deletion mutations of VHL protein have been linked to type 1 VHL with a low risk of pheochromocytoma (adrenal gland tumors). Type 2 VHL has been linked to missense mutations and is linked to a high risk of pheochromocytoma. Type 2 has also been further subdivided based on risks of renal cell carcinoma. In types 1, 2A and 2B the mutant pVHL is defective in HIF regulation, while type 2C mutant are defective in protein kinase C regulation. These genotype–phenotype correlations suggest that missense mutations of pVHL lead to a 'gain of function' protein.

The involvement in VHL in renal cell cancer can be rationalized via multiple characteristics of renal cells. First, they are more sensitive to the effects of growth factors created downstream of HIF activation than other cells. Secondly, the link to Cyclin D1 (as mentioned above) is only seen in renal cells. Finally, many cells in the kidney normally operate under hypoxic conditions. This may give them a proliferative advantage over other cells while in hypoxic environments.

In addition to its interaction with HIF the VHL protein can also associate with tubulin. It is then capable to stabilize and thus elongate microtubules. This function plays a key role in the stabilisation of the spindle during mitosis. Deletion of VHL causes a drastic increase of misorientated and rotating spindles during mitosis. Through a not-yet-known mechanism, VHL also increases the concentration of MAD2, an important protein of the spindle checkpoint. Thus VHL loss leads to a weakened checkpoint and subsequently chromosome missegregation and aneuploidy.

Pathology
Von Hippel–Lindau syndrome (VHL) is a dominantly inherited hereditary cancer syndrome predisposing to a variety of malignant and benign tumors of the eye, brain, spinal cord, kidney, pancreas, and adrenal glands. A germline mutation of this gene is the basis of familial inheritance of VHL syndrome. Individuals with VHL syndrome inherit one mutation in the VHL protein that causes  the protein's normal function to be lost or altered. Over time, sporadic mutation in the second copy of the VHL protein can lead to carcinomas, in particular hemangioblastomas affecting the liver and kidneys, renal (and vaginal) clear cell adenocarcinomas.

The loss of VHL protein activity results in an increased amount of HIF1a, and thus increased levels of angiogenic factors, including VEGF and PDGF. In turn, this leads to unregulated blood vessel growth, one of the prerequisites of a tumor. Additionally, VHL has been implicated in maintaining the differentiated phenotype in renal cells. Furthermore, cell culture experiments with VHL -/- cells have shown that the addition of pVHL can induce a mesenchymal to epithelial transition. This evidence suggests that VHL has a central role in maintaining a differentiated phenotype in the cell.

Additionally, pVHL is important for extracellular matrix formation. This protein may also be important in inhibition of matrix metalloproteinases. These ideas are extremely important in the metastasis of VHL-deficient cells. In classical VHL disease a single wild-type allele in VHL appears to be sufficient to maintain normal cardiopulmonary function.

Treatment

Suggested targets for VHL-related cancers include targets of the HIF pathway, such as VEGF. Inhibitors of VEGF receptor sorafenib, sunitinib, pazopanib, and recently axitinib have been approved by the FDA. The mTOR inhibitor rapamycin analogs everolimus and temsirolimus or VEGF monoclonal antibody bevacizumab may also be an option.

Since iron, 2-oxoglutarate and oxygen are necessary for the inactivation of HIF, it has been theorized that a lack of these cofactors could reduce the ability of hydroxylases in inactivating HIF. A recent study has shown that in cells with a high activation of HIF even in oxygenated environments was reversed by supplying the cells with ascorbate. Thus, Vitamin C may be a potential treatment for HIF induced tumors.

Interactions 

Von Hippel–Lindau tumor suppressor has been shown to interact with:

 CCDC82,
 CUL2, 
 Filamin, 
 HIF1AN, 
 HIF1A, 
 Nerve Growth factor IB, 
 PHF17, 
 PSMC3, 
 SAP130, 
 TCEB1, 
 TCEB2, and
 USP33.

See also

References

Further reading

External links 
 VHL Alliance
  GeneReviews/NCBI/NIH/UW entry on Von Hippel–Lindau Syndrome or Angiomatosis Retinae, VHL Syndrome, von Hippel–Lindau Disease
 

Tumor suppressor genes
EC 6.3